Norman Arthur Wood (1889 – 28 July 1916) was an English professional footballer who played in the Football League for Stockport County as an inside left. His play was described as "unselfish, for with a crafty left foot he made openings and opportunities for colleagues".

Personal life 
On 7 May 1906, Wood enlisted in the 6th (Inniskilling) Dragoons, but was discharged little over two months later, due to "having made a misstatement as to age on enlistment". On 8 February 1915, six months after Britain's entry into the First World War, Wood enlisted in the Football Battalion of the Middlesex Regiment. Despite being demoted to corporal for absenteeism in November 1915, Wood rose to the rank of sergeant. He was killed at Delville Wood in July 1916 and is commemorated on the Thiepval Memorial.

Career statistics

References

English footballers
English Football League players
Association football inside forwards
Bromley F.C. players
Tottenham Hotspur F.C. players
Crystal Palace F.C. players
1800s births
Footballers from Tooting
1916 deaths
Middlesex Regiment soldiers
British Army personnel of World War I
Plymouth Argyle F.C. players
Croydon Common F.C. players
Chelsea F.C. players
Stockport County F.C. players
Military personnel from London
Stalybridge Celtic F.C. players
Southern Football League players
Reading F.C. wartime guest players
British military personnel killed in the Battle of the Somme
Child soldiers
British military personnel killed in World War I
6th (Inniskilling) Dragoons soldiers